CSKA Dushanbe was a football club in Tajikistan. The club last appeared in the top division of the country, the Tajik League in 2006. This was the central army club in Tajikistan. The others clubs of the army are CSKA Pamir Dushanbe and also formerly SKA-Hatlon Farhor.

History

Domestic history

References

Football clubs in Tajikistan
Football clubs in Dushanbe
Military association football clubs